Khalifa Sports City Stadium, also known as Isa Town Stadium, is a multi-use stadium in Isa Town, Bahrain.  It is currently used mostly for association football. The stadium holds 15,000 people and was opened in 1968. It was last renovated in 2007.

Facilities
The stadium underwent a $24.4 million (9.2 million BHD) renovation in 2007 that incorporated natural grass on the main football pitch and constructing a new main stand that can carry 3,600 spectators. Another multipurpose sport hall was constructed with a capacity for 3,600 spectators. This hall can host handball, badminton, basketball and volleyball matches. An Olympic size swimming wall with a stand for 500 spectators was also built in addition to a 5-metre diving pool. The expansion was designed by Tilke and Partners.

History
The stadium hosted nine games of the 21st Arabian Gulf Cup in 2013.

Notable matches

References

Football venues in Bahrain
Isa Town
1968 establishments in Bahrain
Sports venues completed in 1968